Saitidops is a genus of jumping spiders that was first described by Eugène Louis Simon in 1901.  it contains only two species, found only in Venezuela and on the Greater Antilles: S. albopatellus and S. clathratus.

References

Salticidae genera
Salticidae
Spiders of South America
Spiders of the Caribbean
Taxa named by Eug%C3%A8ne Simon